Myrciaria vexator, the false jaboticaba, or blue grape tree, is a species of plant in the family Myrtaceae.

Description 
M. vexator is a slow-growing evergreen tree that can grow up to 10 metres tall. The fruit is dark purple and plum-sized. It is bigger, darker, and has thicker skin than the Jaboticaba. The leaves are layered and deep green, the bark peels, and the flowers are small and white.

Distribution 
Myrciaria vexator is endemic to Costa Rica, Panama, and Venezuela. It is frequently found growing on road verges.

References

vexator
Crops originating from the Americas
Tropical fruit
Flora of Central America
Endemic flora of Brazil
Cauliflory
Fruit trees
Berries
Plants described in 1963